Flavonoid 3',5'-hydroxylase ( was wrongly classified as  in the past) is an enzyme with systematic name flavanone,NADPH:oxygen oxidoreductase. This enzyme catalyses the following chemical reaction

 flavanone + 2 NADPH + 2 H+ + 2 O2  3',5'-dihydroxyflavanone + 2 NADP+ + 2 H2O (overall reaction)
(1a) flavanone + NADPH + H+ + O2  3'-hydroxyflavanone + NADP+ + H2O
(1b) 3'-hydroxyflavanone + NADPH + H+ + O2  3',5'-dihydroxyflavanone + NADP+ + H2O

Flavonoid 3',5'-hydroxylase is a heme-thiolate protein (P-450).

References

External links 
 

EC 1.14.14